China Railway Shenyang Group, officially abbreviated as CR Shenyang or CR-Shenyang, formerly, Shenyang Railway Administration is a subsidiaries company under the jurisdiction of the China Railway (formerly the Ministry of Railway). It supervises the railway network within Liaoning, Jilin, and mid-eastern Inner Mongolia. The railway administration was reorganized as a company in November 2017.

Adobe Flash Outage In Dalian Depot Scheduling 
The company (as of Jan 2020) uses software based on Adobe Flash to plan dispatches in the Dalian depot. Flash's January 12 deactivation led the company reportedly to shut down for a day as the program stopped working. The issue was fixed by reverting to an older version of Flash. The company stated that no disruption of train services happened and only a couple of redundant PCs in the depot were affected, not the train schedule itself.

Hub stations
 Shenyang
 Changchun
 
 Dalian
 
 Qinhuangdao

Regional services

C-train services
 
 —
4301/4302 Jilin-Shulan Through Train
6021/6022 Jilin-Harbin Through Train

References

Rail transport in Liaoning
Rail transport in Jilin
China Railway Corporation